Jan Oosterbaan (born 10 November 1937) is a Dutch volleyball player. He competed in the men's tournament at the 1964 Summer Olympics.

References

1937 births
Living people
Dutch men's volleyball players
Olympic volleyball players of the Netherlands
Volleyball players at the 1964 Summer Olympics
Sportspeople from Voorburg
20th-century Dutch people